Aruva Velu is a 1996 Tamil language action drama film directed by P. S. Bharathi Kannan. The film stars Nassar and Urvashi. It was released on 15 January 1996.

Plot

The film begins with Velu (Nassar) being sentenced to the death penalty.

In the past, Velu was an angry man who solved villagers problems by violence. Whereas Muthurasa (Rajesh), Velu's uncle, was a respected village chief who solved villagers problems peacefully. Maruthayi (Urvashi), Muthurasa's daughter, loved her cousin Velu. Alavanthar (Anandaraj), a stone-hearted rich landlord, exploits the villagers and with his twin sons (Ram-Lakshman) spread terror among the villagers. Muthurasa helped the villagers by giving them some lands. Alavanthar, angry, managed to kill some villagers and Muthurasa informed the police. Alavanthar was therefore arrested, he was immediately released and killed Muthurasa. To take revenge, Velu killed one of Alavanthar's son and he was arrested. Thereafter, Velu managed to escape from jail and killed the other son of Alavanthar. Alavanthar killed a police officer and blamed Velu for the murder. Velu was once again sent to jail and Maruthayi committed suicide. At her funeral, Velu, who was escorted by the police, escaped and he eventually killed Alavanthar.

Velu is then hanged in jail for his crimes.

Cast

Nassar as Velu
Urvashi as Maruthayi
Anandaraj as Alavanthar
Rajesh as Muthurasa
Ram as Alavanthar's son
Lakshman as Alavanthar's son
S. N. Lakshmi as Velu's grandmother
Nellai Siva as Police officer
Singamuthu as Gurukkal
Bonda Mani
Jyothi Meena as Ponni
A. K. Veerasamy as Ponni's father
Krishnamoorthy
Sethu Vinayagam as Jailer
LIC Narasimhan
Karuppu Subbiah
Vellai Subbaiah

Soundtrack

The film score and the soundtrack were composed by Adithyan. The soundtrack, released in 1999, features 5 tracks with lyrics written by Panchu Arunachalam, Vairamuthu and Madhurakasi.

References

1996 films
1990s Tamil-language films
Indian drama films